Andrew Kirmse is an American computer programmer.  He was a co-creator of Meridian 59, the first 3D massively-multiplayer online game.  While an engineer at Google, he co-created Google Now, a predictive search engine.

Early life 
Andrew Kirmse attended Thomas Jefferson High School for Science and Technology.

Video games 

Andrew and his brother Chris developed the code for Meridian 59 in their parents' basement while they were in college.  Meridian was the first online game to include 3D graphics.  After a beta period, it was published by The 3DO Company in 1996, where it ran until 2000.  Meridian's code was open-sourced in 2012, and it continues to run for free today.

While at LucasArts, Andrew served as graphics programmer on the PlayStation 2 game Star Wars: Starfighter.

Andrew contributed to the first four volumes of the Game Programming Gems series of books about video game development.  He was the editor of Game Programming Gems 4.

Google 

Andrew began working at Google in 2003, where he managed the Google Earth team.  He later started and led Google Now, which was named Innovation of the Year by Popular Science in 2012, and won the Grand Prize at the 2013 User Experience Awards.  He gave an invited talk on Google Now at the 2014 WWW Conference.

References

External links 
 Meridian 59 home page
 Meridian 59 open source on github
 Audio interview with BBC Radio on the history of Meridian 59
 Google Now description

Google employees
Thomas Jefferson High School for Science and Technology alumni
Year of birth missing (living people)
Living people